Graham Alan Zug (born April 12, 1987, in Manheim, Pennsylvania) is a former collegiate American football wide receiver who played for the Penn State Nittany Lions.

Early years
Zug attended Manheim Central High School in Manheim, Pennsylvania, where he  was named the 2005 Lancaster-Lebanon League Player-of-the-Year, edging out future Nittany Lion teammate, Jared Odrick.

Collegiate career
During the 2007 season, Zug participated in two games, making one reception for eight yards against Florida International University.

In Penn State's 2008 season, despite being behind future NFL signees Derrick Williams, Jordan Norwood, and Deon Butler on Penn State's depth chart, Zug saw action in every game.  He accumulated 11 receptions for 174 yards, including two touchdowns.

Zug played in every game of the 2009 season, starting nine. He led the Nittany Lions with seven touchdown catches and was second in receptions with 46. Zug had a career day in the October 24, 2009 win at Michigan, catching five passes for 59 yards and a career-high three touchdowns, making him the first Penn State player to catch three touchdowns in a game since Deon Butler in 2008.

Personal
Zug has an older brother, David, who was a member of the Penn State Blue Band, and a younger sister, Daneen, who was a member of the Penn State women's field hockey team. His parents are David and Claudia Zug.

Internet phenomenon

Zug has become somewhat of an internet meme—especially on the Penn State sports-related blog, Black Shoe Diaries, where his fictional, absurdly heroic exploits are celebrated in the vein of "Chuck Norris facts."

References

External links
 
 "Counting Down the Lions: #14", nittanywhiteout.com, August 29, 2009.
 "PSU wide receiver proves doubters wrong", Tricia Lafferty, Pittsburgh Tribune-Review, September 15, 2009

1987 births
American football wide receivers
Living people
Penn State Nittany Lions football players
People from Manheim, Pennsylvania
Players of American football from Pennsylvania